Tajuria cippus, the peacock royal, is a species of lycaenid or blue butterfly found in the Indomalayan realm.

Description

Sri Lanka
In Sri lanka these species are sometimes rare, because of the deforestation in some parts of the country.

Subspecies
T. c. cippus North India, Assam to Thailand
T. c. longinus (Fabricius, 1798) Ceylon, South India
T. c. maxentius Fruhstorfer, 1912 Langkawi, Peninsular Malaya, Singapore
T. c. pseudolonginus (Doubleday, 1847) Java
T. c. theodosius  Fruhstorfer, 1912 Bawean
T. c. frontinus  Fruhstorfer, 1912 Lombok
T. c. bagus  (Kheil, 1884) Nias
T. c. malcolmi  Riley & Godfrey Hainan

Gallery

References

, A Checklist of Butterflies in Indo-China, Chiefly from Thailand, Laos & Vietnam.

Tajuria
Butterflies of Asia
Butterflies of Singapore